Dance Me Outside is a 1994 Canadian drama film, directed by Bruce McDonald. It was based on a book by W.P. Kinsella.

The film premiered at the 1994 Toronto International Film Festival, before going into commercial release in 1995.

Plot
On the Kidabanesee reserve in Northern Ontario lives Silas Crow (Ryan Black), a young man looking for direction in life. He is uncertain about taking an automobile mechanic's course in college.  His general confusion with life is most readily evident in his appearance. He wears an old ratty black fedora, a strange assortment of cargo pants, as well as a long, black trench coat. Frank Fencepost (Adam Beach) is Crow's best friend, and Sadie Maracle (Jennifer Podemski) is his girlfriend.

A young girl from the reserve is murdered by Clarence Gaskill (Hugh Dillon); the white man's sentence is light, leading the community to demand justice or vengeance.

Production
Dance Me Outside was the first acting role for Dillon, who was previously known as a rock singer. He later starred in McDonald's Hard Core Logo, and has since gone on to become an acclaimed actor in television series such as Durham County and Flashpoint.

The rock band Leslie Spit Treeo and singer-songwriter Vern Cheechoo appeared in the film, performing in concert at the reserve's community hall, "The Blue Quill Hall". Blue Quill is a borrowed name of a community in W.P. Kinsella's hometown of Edmonton. Other contributors to the soundtrack included the folk music duo Kashtin, singer-songwriter Keith Secola and Dillon's band The Headstones, as well as previously recorded songs by Redbone and The Ramones, and an instrumental score by Mychael Danna.

The film was shot primarily on the Shawanaga, Wasauksing and Sucker Creek First Nations reserves near Parry Sound, with a small amount of location shooting in Parry Sound.

Television series
A television series, The Rez, was spun off from the film in 1996. In the series, Frank Fencepost was played by Darrel Dennis instead of Adam Beach, who was instead given the role of the chief's son, Charlie. Ryan Black and Jennifer Podemski kept their roles, while Podemski's sister Tamara played a new character named Lucy.

Awards
The film won two Genie Awards at the 16th Genie Awards in 1996, for Best Editing (Michael Pacek) and Best Sound Editing (Steve Munro, Andy Malcolm, Michael Pacek, Peter Winninger and Michael Werth). It was also nominated, but did not win, for Best Overall Sound (Keith Elliott, Peter Kelly, Daniel Pellerin and Ross Redfern).

Availability

After the film's spring 1995 theatrical run, the film was released on videocassette in 1995 by A-Pix Entertainment and in Canada that same year by Cineplex Odeon. The Canadian tape contained the music video for "Cemetery" performed by The Headstones. Video Service Corporation released the film on DVD in 2008.

References

External links

1994 films
English-language Canadian films
Canadian drama films
First Nations films
Films directed by Bruce McDonald
Films set in Northern Ontario
Films based on works by W. P. Kinsella
Films scored by Mychael Danna
1994 drama films
1990s English-language films
1990s Canadian films